The 1989 Purdue Boilermakers football team represented Purdue University as a member of the Big Ten Conference during the 1989 NCAA Division I-A football season. Led by third-year head coach Fred Akers, the Boilermakers compiled an overall record of 3–8 with a mark of 2–6 in conference play, placing eighth in the Big Ten. It was Purdue's fifth straight losing season. The team played home games at Ross–Ade Stadium in West Lafayette, Indiana.

Schedule

Personnel

Preseason
Brian Fox transferred after spring practice to Florida, citing a desire to be closer to home and head coach Fred Akers' adjustment of the offensive scheme.

Game summaries

Miami (OH)

at Washington

Notre Dame

at Minnesota

Larry Sullivan tied a school record with 51-yard field goal
Darren Trieb was suspended for the game for violation of team rules

Illinois

Jeff Lesniewicz made his first career start for Purdue

at Ohio State

Michigan State

Homecoming
Jeff Lesniewicz knocked out of game with concussion

at Michigan

Northwestern

Purdue snapped a streak of 10 straight games without a first quarter point.

Iowa

at Indiana

Larry Sullivan kicked a 32-yard field goal with 2:51 left and Scott Bonnell missed a 26-yard field goal for Indiana with 1:29 remaining. 
 Fred Akers was carried off the field by his players.

Awards
Eric Hunter 
Big Ten Freshman of the Year

References

Purdue
Purdue Boilermakers football seasons
Purdue Boilermakers football